The Atkinson County Courthouse is a historic county courthouse in Pearson, Atkinson County, Georgia. It was designed by J.J. Baldwin and built in 1920. It was added to the National Register of Historic Places on September 18, 1980. It was remodeled in the 1980s. It is located at West Austin Avenue and South Main Street.

See also
National Register of Historic Places listings in Atkinson County, Georgia

References

County courthouses in Georgia (U.S. state)
Courthouses on the National Register of Historic Places in Georgia (U.S. state)
Buildings and structures in Atkinson County, Georgia
Government buildings completed in 1920
National Register of Historic Places in Atkinson County, Georgia